National Express Group is a British multinational public transport company headquartered in Birmingham, England. It operates bus, coach, train and tram services in the United Kingdom, the Republic of Ireland (National Express operates Eurolines in conjunction with Bus Éireann), United States, Canada, Spain, Portugal, Malta, Germany, Bahrain, and Morocco and long-distance coach services across Europe. It is listed on the London Stock Exchange and is a constituent of the FTSE 250 Index.

History

In 1972, the state-owned National Bus Company decided to bring together the scheduled coach services operated by its bus operating companies in the United Kingdom under one brand. Sir Frederick Wood, a prominent businessman and industrialist, was asked to oversee the creation of this new business model and led the group as its chairman from 1972 to 1978. Initially branded as National, the National Express brand was first used in 1974.

With the privatisation of the National Bus Company in the 1980s, National Express was subject to a management buyout in March 1988. The management team began to diversify, and in 1989 they purchased Crosville Wales but its financial performance began to deteriorate from early 1990. A new management team took over the company in July 1991, with the backing of mid-market private equity firm, ECI Partners. The new team refocused the group on its core activities and sold Crosville Wales to British Bus. In October 1991, it purchased Speedlink, an operator of coach services between Gatwick and Heathrow Airports. In December 1992, National Express Group plc was floated on the London Stock Exchange.

Acquisitions and disposals
In 1993, Scottish Citylink, Eurolines and East Midlands Airport were acquired. In April 1995 National Express purchased West Midlands Travel, the formerly council owned bus network of Birmingham and the West Midlands and rebranded it Travel West Midlands in September 1996. This began the brand family of Travel ... local bus operations. Bournemouth Airport was acquired in April 1995.

In April 1996, National Express commenced operating its first UK rail franchises, Gatwick Express and Midland Mainline. Other franchises won in 1997 were Silverlink, Central Trains and ScotRail. To comply with a Monopolies & Mergers Commission ruling on it winning the ScotRail franchise, National Express sold the Scottish Citylink operation to Metroline in August 1998.

In February 1997, Taybus Public Transport was acquired and rebranded Travel Dundee.

In September 1998, Crabtree-Harmon, the seventh-largest student transportation bus company in the United States was acquired, with 82 school bus contracts mainly in Missouri, but also in other Midwest states including Colorado, Iowa, Kansas, Oklahoma and Utah. In February 1999, Robinson Bus Service was purchased followed in August 1999 by Durham Transportation. These acquisitions placed National Express as one of the top three United States school bus operators.

In May 1999, National Express purchased Australia's largest private bus operator, National Bus Company. National Bus Company had bus operations in Brisbane, Melbourne and Perth, and also held a 57% shareholding in Westbus, Sydney's largest bus operator. Westbus also had a London coach operation. In August 1999, National Express won the M>Train, M>Tram and V/Line Passenger rail franchises in the Australian state of Victoria.

In January 2000, National Express expanded into the American market by acquiring ATC, a public transportation operator. In July 2000, Prism Rail was purchased adding the c2c, Wales & Borders, Wessex Trains and West Anglia Great Northern franchises to National Express' portfolio.

In December 2002, National Express handed in its Victorian rail franchises having been unable to renegotiate financial terms with the State Government.

In February 2004, the London bus operations of Connex were purchased and rebranded Travel London. In April 2004, National Express East Anglia commenced operating the Greater Anglia rail franchise. In September 2004, National Express sold its Melbourne bus operations to Ventura Bus Lines, and Brisbane and Perth bus operations to Connex. After being placed in administration in January 2005, Westbus was sold to ComfortDelGro Cabcharge in August 2005.

In June 2005, the London bus arm of Tellings-Golden Miller was purchased and also rebranded Travel London. In July 2005, National Express sold ATC to Connex. In October 2005, National Express agreed to buy most of the operations of privately owned Spanish transport operator ALSA, which operates bus and coach services in Spain, Portugal and Morocco, and long-distance coach services to other parts of Europe. Alsa's operations in South America and China were retained by the previous owners.

In April 2007, National Express acquired Continental Auto, the second-largest bus and coach operator in Spain.

In November 2007, South East England coach operator The Kings Ferry was purchased and an airport to hotel shuttle service in London branded Dot2Dot was launched. It was not successful and ceased in November 2008.

In November 2007, National Express announced plans to re-brand all of their operations under a new unified National Express identity. It was intended to achieve greater recognition for all the group companies, to coincide with recent acquisitions and after current rail operations had improved in reliability to warrant association with the established express coach image. It coincided with the appointment of a group director for all UK operations and relocation of the head office from London to Birmingham, bringing all operations under a single strategic management structure. Day-to-day management remains within individual companies.

In December 2007, National Express East Coast commenced operating the InterCity East Coast franchise. In May 2009, National Express sold Travel London and Travel Surrey to Abellio.

In February 2013, National Express Germany was awarded two regional rail contracts by the Verkehrsverbund Rhein-Ruhr, Zweckverband Nahverkehr Rheinland and Zweckverband Nahverkehr Westfalen-Lippe authorities that commenced in December 2015.

In January 2015, the Bayerische Eisenbahngesellschaft announced that National Express had been selected to operate the Nuremberg S-Bahn system from December 2018. It was to have been the first Deutsche Bahn S-Bahn network to be taken over by a private operator. However, in October 2016, National Express elected to pull out, citing a delay in the ability to order new rolling stock while a challenge brought on by Deutsche Bahn was resolved, would make its bid unviable.

In June 2015, it was announced that the parts 2 and 3 of the Rhein-Ruhr-Express which will be introduced in 2018 will be operated by National Express. This includes Regional-Express services RE4, RE5 and RE6 in Northrhine-Westphalia.

In December 2016, coach operator Clarkes of London was purchased with 56 vehicles. In March 2020, Lucketts Travel was purchased.

In January 2023, the coach excursion business of seven National Express Transport Solutions companies (Coliseum Coaches, Lucketts Travel, Mortons Travel, Solent Tours, Stewarts Tours, Woods Tours and Worthing Coaches) were brought together under the 'Touromo' brand. Touromo aims to provide day trips and short breaks to destinations across the UK and Europe as one combined brand, and National Express plans to expand the brand outside the West Midlands and South East England to operate across the United Kingdom. The names of the involved coach operators are to be retained by National Express Transport Solutions for private hire services.

Default on East Coast rail franchise

In July 2009, the Department for Transport announced that it would take the National Express East Coast franchise into public ownership at the end of the year after National Express announced it would not invest any further funds into the franchise, effectively declaring it planned to default. Directly Operated Railways took over the East Coast franchise on 14 November 2009. Also in November 2009 the government announced that National Express East Anglia would not be granted a three-year extension that it had otherwise qualified for, because of the East Coast default.

Operational safety concerns
On 3 January 2007, a speeding National Express coach overturned on the M4/M25 slip road, leaving three passengers dead. The driver was jailed for five years.

In July 2009, a junior transport minister, the Gillingham MP Paul Clark, spelled out a series of concerns to National Express in a letter following a meeting with an employee of National Express East Coast who lives in his constituency. The worker claimed that due to reduced maintenance checks, some trains were in use with defective brakes, an allegation strongly denied by the company, which said it would "never compromise on safety". He wrote: "As a result of reduced maintenance checks, 'some long-haul sets [trains] are in use with brake defects'. Increasing cuts in staff combined with an increasing pressure to ensure that trains run safely has resulted in fears among staff that a major accident is 'just around the corner'." Passengers, he added, "have been 'poisoned' as a result of coffee machines not being cleaned correctly, with cleaning fluids left in situ". The minister said he was "shocked and appalled at the information with which I've been provided. You will understand that these allegations are exceptionally serious".

School bus drivers in the US have raised concerns about the safety of the buses run by Durham, a subsidiary of National Express, and the second-largest operator of school bus services in North America. According to representatives of Durham bus drivers, fluid leaks, tyres that need to be replaced, black mould and non-functional emergency equipment are regular concerns, whilst workers continued to operate buses while sick because they cannot afford to miss a day of work and drivers are not paid for all the time they work.

Offers for the company

With the company's finances under stress largely as a result of having overbid for the National Express East Coast rail franchise, National Express became a takeover target in 2009. In June 2009, a takeover offer from fellow transport operator FirstGroup was rejected. On 3 September 2009, National Express' largest shareholder, Spain's Cosmen family with 18.5%, and CVC Capital Partners made a takeover offer of £765 million for the company. The Takeover Panel set a deadline of 11 September 2009 for all prospective bids.

National Express agreed to allow the Cosmen/CVC consortium to undertake due diligence in September 2009. The Cosmen/CVC consortium had reached an agreement to sell the UK bus and rail operations to Stagecoach Group if its offer was successful. The deadline for offers was subsequently extended to 16 October 2009.

On 16 October 2009, the Cosmen/CVC consortium withdrew their offer. with Stagecoach submitting a new all-share bid later the same day. This too did not proceed and in November 2009 National Express announced it would raise the necessary capital through a share issue. In September 2021, National Express entered into talks to acquire Stagecoach Group. In December 2021, a deal was agreed between the boards of the two companies: however, it was subject to both shareholder approval and regulatory scrutiny. Having originally recommended shareholders accept the National Express offer, in March 2022 the Stagecoach board of directors withdrew its recommendation in favour of a takeover offer from a DWS managed investment fund.

Operations

National Express' operations are summarised below:

Europe

Bus and coach
The bus and coach services operated by the group are:

Bus
AirLinks (contract bus operation at UK airports)
National Express West Midlands (Major bus operations in Birmingham and the rest of the West Midlands)
National Express Coventry (bus operation in and around Coventry, a subsidiary of National Express West Midlands)

Coach
National Express Coaches (long-distance express and airport coach services in the UK)
National Express Transport Solutions 
Lucketts Travel (private coach hire)
The Kings Ferry (commuter services and private coach hire)
Stewarts Coaches (private coach hire and tours)
Clarkes of London (commuter services and private coach hire)
Woods Coaches (private coach hire and tours)
Worthing Coaches (private coach hire and tours)
Mortons Travel (private coach hire and tours)
Coliseum Coaches (private coach hire and tours)
Solent Coaches (private coach hire and tours)
ALSA including Continental-Auto (coach services in Spain and Western Europe)
 In 2016, National Express coach tickets are distributed through Europe by the online booking platform SoBus.

Railway

National Express Germany operates a number of train services in the German state of North Rhine-Westphalia.

 Wupper-Express (RE 4), from December 2020
 Rhein-Express (RE/RRX 5), from June 2019
 Westfalen-Express (RE/RRX 6), from December 2019
 Rhein-Münsterland-Express (RE 7), from December 2015
 Rhein-Wupper-Bahn (RB 48), from December 2015

Following the financial difficulties of Abellio GmbH, National Express was awarded an emergency contract to operate further services in North Rhine-Westphalia from February 2022 to run for two years.
 NRW-Express (RE/RRX 1) Aachen-Hamm
 Rhein-Hellweg-Express (RE11) Düsseldorf-Kassel.

USA and Canada

Bus
National Express Transit (transit and paratransit bus operation in the US, formed in 2012)
JATRAN
Kern Transit
Manteca Transit
Merced County Transit
SolTrans
Victor Valley Transit Authority
Westmoreland County Transit Authority
A&S Transportation (school bus operations in Florida)
A1A Transportation (school bus operations in Florida)
Aristocrat Limousine and Bus (limo and charter bus service in New Jersey)
Cook DuPage Transportation (paratransit service in Chicago area)
Diamond Transportation (paratransit and shuttle service in Washington, DC area, acquired 2016)
Durham School Services (school bus operation in the US)
Monroe School Transportation (school and charter bus operations in Rochester, New York)
New Dawn Transit (school bus operations in New York City)
Petermann Transportation (school bus and special service bus operation in US, acquired 2011)
Quality Bus Service (school bus operations in Orange County, New York)
Queen City Transportation (school and charter bus operations in Ohio, acquired 2017)
Stock Transportation (school bus operation in Canada)
Suburban Paratransit (paratransit service in New York)
Total Transit (transit and paratransit service in Arizona)
Trans Express (shuttle, charter, tour, and casino service in New York, acquired 2015)
Trinity Transportation (charter and school service in Michigan, acquired 2017)
White Plains Bus (charter service in New York)
In July 2014, National Express partners with Canadian-based online booking platform Busbud.

Middle East

Bus
In February 2015, the Bahrain Public Transport Company in which National Express holds a 50% shareholding commenced operating a 10-year concession in Bahrain.

Former operations

Europe

Bus and coach

Bus
In May 2009, National Express sold some of its bus operations to Abellio:
Travel London (bus operation under contract to Transport for London in London)
Travel Surrey (bus operation Surrey and South West London – a subsidiary of Travel London)

In December 2020, National Express sold its Xplore Dundee business to McGill's Bus Services.

Coach
Scottish Citylink sold to Metroline in August 1998 in order to comply with a Competition Commission requirement for National Express to operate the ScotRail rail franchise
City2City an express coach services in Germany that ceased on 14 October 2014.

Railway and tram

Railway
Rail franchises formerly operated:
Wales & Borders passed to Arriva Trains Wales in December 2003
ScotRail passed to First ScotRail in October 2004
Wessex Trains, absorbed into Greater Western franchise and passed to First Great Western in April 2006
West Anglia Great Northern split into two parts: West Anglia services transferred to National Express East Anglia April 2004, Great Northern services passed to First Capital Connect in April 2006
In November 2007 several franchises were lost in a general restructure:
Central Trains split between CrossCountry, East Midlands Trains and London Midland
Midland Mainline absorbed into East Midlands Trains franchise
Silverlink split between London Midland and London Overground
Gatwick Express incorporated into Southern franchise in June 2008
National Express East Coast passed to Directly Operated Railways in November 2009
National Express East Anglia (including Stansted Express service) passed to Abellio Greater Anglia in February 2012
c2c operated from May 1996 until sold to Trenitalia in February 2017

Tram
National Express Midland Metro (now West Midlands Metro tram line), passed to Transport for West Midlands in 2018.

London & Continental Railways
National Express had a 17.5% shareholding in London & Continental Railways (L&CR) from its formation in September 1994 until it was nationalised by the Government of the United Kingdom in 2009. L&CR was responsible for building the High Speed 1 project. National Express also held a 40% stake in the Inter-Capital and Regional Rail consortium which held the management contract for the UK arm of the Eurostar operation, L&CR's subsidiary Eurostar International from 1998 to 2010.

Airports
In the 1990s National Express moved into the privatisation of airports, purchasing East Midlands, Bournemouth, and Humberside Airports. In a move to concentrate on bus and rail provision, Humberside was sold to Manchester Airports Group in 1999 followed by Bournemouth and East Midlands in February 2001.

Until November 2007 the group also operated Stewart International Airport in New Windsor, New York. However, the lease was sold to the public Port Authority of New York and New Jersey.

Australian operations

Bus and coach
Australian bus companies previously operated:
Westbus and Hillsbus in Sydney, sold to ComfortDelGro Cabcharge in 2005. Westbus ceased operating in 2013.
Blue Ribbon in the Hunter Region, sold to ComfortDelgro Cabcharge and rebranded Hunter Valley Buses in 2005.
National Bus Company, Melbourne, sold to Ventura Bus Lines in 2004, ceased operating in 2013.
National Bus Company, Brisbane, sold to Connex in 2004, now operating as Transdev Queensland.
Southern Coast Transit, Perth, sold to Connex in 2004, now operating as Transdev WA.

Railway and tram
In 1999, the Group gained the Australian franchises M>Train, M>Tram and V/Line Passenger, following the privatisation of rail and tram services by the Government of Victoria. After incurring large losses and being unable to renegotiate the franchise contracts, the operations were handed back to the State Government. M>Train was re-let to Connex and M>Tram to Transdev. V/Line became a government-owned corporation.

USA and Canada

Bus and coach
ATC (transit and paratransit operations in the United States and Canada, sold to Veolia Environnement in 2005 and since renamed Veolia Transport).
Yuma County Area Transit
Arlington Transit (transit and paratransit operations in the United States from 2009 to 2019, transferred to First Transit in 2019)

In popular culture

National Express features in a song, entitled National Express by the Divine Comedy, released in 1998.

Gallery

References

External links

Company website

Bus groups in the United Kingdom
Companies based in Birmingham, West Midlands
Companies listed on the London Stock Exchange
National Express companies
Transport companies established in 1972
Transport operators of the United Kingdom
1972 establishments in the United Kingdom